Paul Hicks may refer to:
 Paul Hicks (rugby league) (born 1977), rugby league footballer
 Paul Hicks (musician) (fl. 1990s–2010s), musician, engineer and mixer

See also
Paul Hix (born 1974), British luger